SuperValue is a chain of locally owned and operated supermarkets in New Zealand, established in 1964. The stores are operated under franchise agreements, with franchise and group operation controlled by Wholesale Distributors Limited (WDL).

There are 38 SuperValue stores around New Zealand, including 6 in Auckland. The franchise is owned and operated by Woolworths New Zealand

History

G.U.S. (Grocers United Stores) was launched as a grocery store co-operative in 1928, and quickly opened 15 stores. Store numbers reached 167 in 1948.

The Opawa, Christchurch store became the first store under the SuperValue brand in 1964. SuperValue started out as SuperValu, with no ‘e’, but following an uproar from customers about the spelling that it was quickly changed.

The 1964 opening of the first SuperValue store was a turning point when New Zealand started adopting the supermarket concept from overseas. At the time this was different for New Zealand consumers, whose usual style was picking weekly groceries from many outlets.

SuperValue Supermarkets was purchased by JR Rattray in 1991. Countdown, SuperValue and Rattray were purchased by Foodland (FAL) in 1993. The brands became subsidiaries of Progressive Enterprises in 1995.

In 2008, SuperValue had 39 stores, including seven in Auckland.
 13 in 2008

In 2014, SuperValue reached the milestone of 50 years in business after 1964 the opening of the first store in Opawa, Christchurch. The company celebrated this by running a ‘Celebrate and Win’ competition, giving customers the chance to win one of five prizes of SuperValue gift cards loaded with $5,000 when they spend $20 or more.

There are 41 SuperValue stores in 2015.

SuperValue Community Cash

SuperValue Supermarkets run a Community Cash scheme which is designed to provide donations to community groups or individuals from within and around the area of the store that is making the donation. Each month every SuperValue Supermarket owner will make a donation of $200 to a community group or deserving individual.

References

External links

http://www.woolworthsnz.co.nz
http://www.woolworthslimited.com.au

Supermarkets of New Zealand
Woolworths Group (Australia)
Retail companies established in 1964
New Zealand companies established in 1964